"Polymorph" is the third episode of science fiction sitcom Red Dwarf Series III, and the fifteenth in the series run. It premiered on the British television channel BBC2 on 28 November 1989. It is considered by some to be the series' best. Written by Rob Grant and Doug Naylor, and directed by Ed Bye, the episode has the crew fighting a shapeshifting, emotion-stealing creature. It is the only Red Dwarf episode to feature a pre-credits warning about the content. The episode was re-mastered, along with the rest of the first three series, in 1998.

Plot
A non-human life-form with shape-changing properties escapes from a waste pod floating in space and gets aboard Red Dwarf. Although Holly (Hattie Hayridge) detects it, despite scepticism by Arnold Rimmer (Chris Barrie) that it's a false alarm, the creature attacks Dave Lister (Craig Charles) while he is having a meal. As Rimmer and Cat (Danny John-Jules) wait for him to recover in the Medical Unit, Kryten (Robert Llewellyn) and Holly reveal the creature to be a man-made genetic mutant called a "Polymorph", designed to leech off of its target's negative emotions, revealing that when Lister suffered immense fear when the creature attacked, it drained him of it and has now left him all too eager to face any danger.

To avoid it, the others seal Lister away and prepare to escape with a Starbug for a getaway. However, the Polymorph manages to capture each on their own, after an accident with heat-seeking bazookoids, and trick them into exposing a negative emotion – Cat loses his vanity; Kryten loses his guilt; and Rimmer loses his anger. All four find themselves at a disadvantage against the creature as a result, but opt to confront it down in the ship's cargo decks. Although things don't start well, they defeat it by pure luck thanks to their earlier accident, causing them to recover their lost emotions. As the group leave the cargo decks, they are unaware of a second Polymorph having boarded the ship from the same waste pod floating past Red Dwarf, which follows them, mimicking Lister's appearance.

Remastered ending
When the episode was remastered, Doug Naylor opted to change the ending of the story – in the remastered version, the second Polymorph makes its appearance as a bouncing ball, whereupon a caption explains that it was less intelligent than the first, stowed away in Lister's clean underpants drawer, and died of old age many years later. Naylor stated the change of ending was due to his dislike of fans asking him about the second creature's fate in the original ending.

Production

Director Ed Bye drew inspiration for the look and design of the episode from watching the 1979 film Alien just before shooting began. For the cargo bay scenes a warehouse in Manchester was hired for the shooting. Empty cardboard boxes were strategically stacked up and down the warehouse floor to give the illusion of a stocked cargo bay.

Although the episode had a pre-credits warning, about the episode's content, this was more of a plot device as the episode was broadcast past the 9:00 pm watershed. During the filming of the Polymorph morphing into Lister's boxer shorts scene the audience laughed so loud for so long that Chris Barrie had to wait several minutes until things had calmed down (the scene is now considered by many to be one of the funniest of the entire series). This also provided extra work in the editing room as the sequence required more work than usual to edit together a workable shot.

The episode also had some of the show's most effects intensive scenes done yet. Animatronic versions of both the small and large Polymorph creature versions were created. The small version was voiced by production manager Mike Agnew. The larger model, which was prone to tipping over, collapsed before the final shot. Blue screen was used to shoot the creature and added to existing footage of the crew. To achieve the Polymorph morphing into all the different objects the traditional locked-off camera and jump-cut procedure was used. The newly introduced Bazookoids provided more video effects as two heat-seeking laser bolts were fired and ended up chasing the Cat. The heat-seekers were given sound effects borrowed from the lightsabers of Star Wars.

Guest appearances included actress Frances Barber who took on a scene as 'Genny Mutant', Kalli Greenwood, who played Rimmer's mother, and the show's first appearance of Rimmer as a young boy, played by Simon Gaffney.

Cultural references
The theme of the episode is a parody of Ridley Scott's 1979 Alien film which features a Xenomorph. The Polymorph's transformations also resemble the Alien's various transformations, from the early small worm to its large incarnation with a huge jaw holding an extendable emotion sucking tongue. The scene where the polymorph shapeshifts into Lister's boxer shorts has a literary parallel in Damon Knight's 1964 short story "Maid to Measure" where a jealous and witchy lady literally changes into a bikini for the use of the woman who's her deadly rival.

Rimmer also says "What about the Rimmer directive, which states never tangle with anything that's got more teeth than the entire Osmond Family." This a reference to the band.

Reception
The episode was originally broadcast on the British television channel BBC2 on 21 November 1989 in the 9:00pm evening time slot, and was well received by fans, many considering it to be the series' best. It came second in a Red Dwarf Smegazine readers poll, gaining 9.3% of the votes. DVD Talk described it as "a great episode because the actors really have fun with their newly transformed attitudes." On the Series III DVD the producers mention "Polymorph" as one of their favorite episodes from the series.

Remastering

The remastering of Series I to III was carried out during the late 1990s. General changes throughout the series included replacement of the opening credits, giving the picture a colour grade and filmising, computer generated special effects of Red Dwarf and many more visual and audio enhancements.

Changes specific to "Polymorph" include:
 The original pre-opening credits warning for viewer discretion on the following episode has been removed.
 A scene near the beginning with The Cat being disgusted by Lister's choice of cutlery was removed
 The polymorph entering Red Dwarf CGI duct systems has been added.
 Lister wrestling with the dummy snake has been re-worked and tightened.
 Kryten's lines have been re-dubbed to remove the English accent from a cargo bay scene.
 Mrs Rimmer's voice has been re-dubbed with a new actress to fit in more with the character.
 The end sequence of the second Lister following the crew has been replaced with an epilogue shot, which explains that the second polymorph hid in Lister's sock drawer and died of old age.

See also
 Better Than Life novel which uses, and expands on the Polymorph premise.
 "Emohawk: Polymorph II", an episode from Series VI which is a pseudo-sequel.
 The Polymorph, the title character of this episode.

Notes

References

External links

Series III episode guide at www.reddwarf.co.uk

Television episodes about genetic engineering
Red Dwarf III episodes
Fiction about shapeshifting
Fictional monsters
1989 British television episodes